Iúna is a municipality located in the Brazilian state of Espírito Santo.

References

Iuna